Palaquium sumatranum is a tree in the family Sapotaceae. The specific epithet sumatranum means "of Sumatra".

Description
The bark is rusty brown. Inflorescences bear up to three flowers.

Distribution and habitat
Palaquium sumatranum is native to Thailand, Sumatra, Borneo and Java. Its habitat is mixed dipterocarp forest.

References

sumatranum
Plants described in 1885
Trees of Thailand
Trees of Sumatra
Trees of Borneo
Trees of Java
Taxa named by William Burck